Kumaraswamy Nanthakopan (Tamil: குமாரசுவாமி நந்தகோபன்; 1970 – November 14, 2008), also known as his nom de guerre Ragu, was the president of the political party of the Tamil Makkal Viduthalai Pulikal in Sri Lanka, a defecting offshoot of the LTTE and advisor to Sivanesathurai Chandrakanthan. He was a staunch Pillaiyan loyalist, and his appointment as TMVP president was opposed by Karuna. He was shot and killed near Colombo by suspected LTTE gunmen on Friday November 14, 2008.

References

1976 births
2008 deaths
Tamil Makkal Viduthalai Pulikal politicians
Sri Lankan Tamil rebels
Sri Lankan Hindus
Assassinated Sri Lankan politicians
People killed during the Sri Lankan Civil War